The Trial: A Murder in the Family is a British television docudrama, produced by Dragonfly Film and television, that first broadcast on Channel 4 on 21 May 2017. The five-part series follows a fictional court case in which university lecturer Simon Davis (Michael Gould) is tried for the murder of his wife Carla, in an attempt to recreate an accurate portrayal of an English legal trial. Filming and recording of nearly all real court proceedings in England and Wales was prohibited, hence the trial presented cannot be a genuine case. However, the prosecuting counsel, defence counsel and judge featured in the series were real professionals; and the jury was made up of twelve members of the British public. The only actors featured were the defendant and other key witnesses.

The series was co-directed by Nick Holt, who won a BAFTA in 2013 for the Channel 4 documentary The Murder Trial, which followed a very similar format. Holt stated that the new format would "bring audiences closer than ever to those mechanics of a real murder trial." Fellow director Kath Mattock said that; "During rehearsals only three actors knew the truth and we tried to maintain that all the way through the trial. Concepts like 'truth' and 'story' are very subjective in a courtroom, so the trial had a natural fluidity within the confines of the legal process." Although the jury were aware that Davis was played by an actor, they were asked to treat the case as if it was a real trial, and only presented with the evidence as it was revealed in court.

Max Hill QC, who appears as the prosecuting barrister in this case, was appointed as the independent reviewer for terrorism laws in the UK shortly before the series was filmed. Davis' defence barrister, John Ryder QC, is notable for having played a crucial part in the trial of those suspected of the murder of Damilola Taylor.

Cast
 Michael Gould as Simon Davis
 Emma Lowndes as Carla Davis
 Kevin Harvey as Lewis Skinner
Fern Deacon as Catherine Davis
 Liam Sargeant as Oscar Davis
 Farshid Rokey as Danny Mullen
 Max Hill QC, Senior Prosecution Barrister
 Michelle Nelson, Junior Prosecution Barrister
 John Ryder QC, Senior Defence Barrister
 Lucy Organ, Junior Defence Barrister
 Brian Barker CBE QC, Crown Court Judge
 Corrine Bowler as Detective Constable No. 1
 Nina Tanner as Detective Constable No. 2

Jury
 Brendan Arndt; Mobile Product Manager
 Tim Hashemi; Student
 Simon Haywood; Security Officer
 James Katz; Barber
 Mark Maylam; Painter and Decorator
 Cherry Morrell; Office Manager
 Natalie Pickup; Teacher
 Martha Vickers; Retired Health Visitor
 Gemma Whitehouse; Hedge Fund Associate
 Christine Bruce-Reid ; Housewife
 Lisa; Tax Inspector
 Daniel; Unknown

Episodes

References

External links

2017 British television series debuts
2017 British television series endings
2010s British crime television series
2010s British workplace drama television series
Channel 4 television dramas
Television series by Endemol
English-language television shows
British television docudramas
Courtroom drama television series
Court shows